Texas's 14th congressional district for the United States House of Representatives stretches from Freeport to Beaumont. It formerly covered the area south and southwest of the Greater Houston region, including Galveston, in the state of Texas.

The district was created as a result of the 1900 U.S. Census and was first contested in 1902. The Galveston area had previously been included in Texas's 10th congressional district. Its first representative was the Democrat James L. Slayden, based in San Antonio, who had served the 12th congressional district since 1897 and was redistricted. He was elected from the new district and began representing the 14th in March 1903 as a member of the 58th United States Congress. He was repeatedly re-elected and served until 1919. He refused nomination in 1918.

Republican Harry M. Wurzbach carried this district in several elections, from 1920 to 1926, serving from 1921 to 1929. He successfully contested the election of 1928, taking his seat in 1930 for the remainder of the term, and was re-elected in 1930. The district during that era included the aberrant counties of Gillespie, Kendall, Comal and Guadalupe, whose German Americans had historically opposed slavery and became Texas' only consistent Republican Party voters during the "Solid South" era. In addition, Galveston was a major port of entry for immigrants, with many arriving from southern and eastern Europe. At that time, many found the Republican Party more welcoming than the dominant Democratic Party. In 1901, the Democratic-dominated legislature had passed a poll tax, which effectively had disfranchised most blacks and many poor whites and Latinos.

The district's ultimate shift to the Republican Party in the 1980s has been attributed to the coattail effect of Ronald Reagan's electoral successes.  A few Democrats have won local and state elections in the 1990s. Former Republican and Libertarian Presidential candidate Ron Paul held congressional office from 1997 to 2013. The district's current representative is the Republican Randy Weber.

Election results from presidential races

List of members representing the district

Election results

1928
The incumbent Harry M. Wurzbach successfully contested the 1928 election of the Democrat Augustus McCloskey to the 71st United States Congress, and was finally seated on February 10, 1930.

1996
In "one of the stranger Congressional elections of modern times", the incumbent Greg Laughlin switched from the Democratic Party to the Republican in 1995. The Republican National Committee, hoping to encourage other Democrats to switch parties, threw its full support behind Laughlin. He had support from Republican leaders, including House Speaker Newt Gingrich and Texas Governor George W. Bush, and the National Rifle Association and other interest groups. Ron Paul, an ob/gyn and former U.S. Representative from Texas's 22nd congressional district, opposed Laughlin. Paul hoped to have more influence in Congress after the Republicans took over both houses in the 1994 election. Though Laughlin defeated Paul in the open primary, a runoff between the two candidates followed.

While Gingrich and other Republican leaders visited the district stumping for Laughlin, Paul ran newspaper ads quoting Gingrich's harsh criticisms of Laughlin's voting record 14 months earlier, before the party switch. Paul won the low-turnout primary runoff with the assistance of a largely out-of-state free-market network of support, such as his Foundation for Rational Economics and Education and other market-oriented organizations. Though he continued to maintain his home in Lake Jackson, Texas, Paul had run for the coastal 14th Congressional district rather than the 22nd district he had previously represented, due to redistricting borders.

Charles "Lefty" Morris, a trial lawyer, was Paul's Democratic opponent in the fall election; he was strongly supported by the AFL–CIO and ran numerous attack ads. Morris cited Paul's past votes to repeal federal drug laws in favor of state legislation, and also ran numerous ads about newsletters which had contained derogatory comments published in Paul's name concerning race and other politicians. Paul's campaign responded at the time that voters might not understand the "tongue-in-cheek, academic" quotes out of context, and rejected Morris's demand to release back issues.

Paul's large contributor base outraised Morris two-to-one, giving him nearly $2 million, the third-highest amount of individual contributions received by any House member (behind Gingrich and Bob Dornan). In his campaign, Paul characterized Morris as a tool of trial lawyers and big labor.

Paul won the election by a close margin of 51% to 48%, the third time he had been elected to Congress as a non-incumbent.

1998
In 1998 Paul again won the Republican primary. The Democratic primary candidates included education professor Margaret Dunn; former congressional aide Roger Elliott; car dealer Tom Reed; and Bay City rice farmer and cattle rancher Loy Sneary. Reed, who claimed to be the only Texas-born candidate in the race, had served in local economic development projects and had been appointed to the White House Conference on Small Business; he was endorsed by the AFL–CIO. Sneary, a self-described "conservative Democrat" and also a former Matagorda County judge, prevailed in the primary; by December 31, 1997, including self-loans, Sneary had outraised Reed by $175,000 to $33,000.

The Democratic Congressional Campaign Committee made the general election its "No. 1 challenge race in the state of Texas". The Texas Farm Bureau endorsed Sneary and ranked Paul's agricultural record poorly. Sneary also said that Paul's anti-government stance left constituents inadequately represented. Paul ran ads warning voters to be "leery of Sneary". Paul accused Sneary of voting to raise his pay by 5%, increasing his judge's travel budget by 400% in one year, and creating more government bureaucracy by starting a new government agency to handle a license plate fee he enacted. Sneary considered Paul's attack to consist of "half-truths and no truths", claims supported by Austin TV station KVUE; his aides replied that he had actually voted to raise all county employees' pay by 5% in a "cost of living" increase. Paul countered that he had never voted to raise Congressional pay.

Paul won the election 55% to 44%, outraising his opponent by a large margin ($2.1 million to $0.7 million).

2000
In 2000, Sneary ran against Paul again, with Paul winning 60% to 40% and raising $2.4 million to Sneary's $1.1 million. As in the prior two elections, the national Democratic Party and major unions had continued targeting Paul with heavy spending.

2002
Paul was re-elected to Congress in 2002. Two Democrats without political experience ran for the primary, but not much support from the Democratic Party was visible. Local Democratic consultant Ed Martin criticized Paul's frequent budget dissents as "180 degrees opposite from" his campaign promises to protect Social Security. Paul's free-market foundation and network of support continued its fundraising strength.

2004
Paul was re-elected to Congress in 2004 (running unopposed).

2006
In 2006, Paul was opposed in the primary race by Cynthia Sinatra, the ex-wife of Frank Sinatra Jr., son of the legendary singer. Paul won the primary handily with nearly 80%, though his opponent campaigned on Paul's lack of support for President George W. Bush. Paul then won the general election by 20%, entering his tenth term and outraising Shane Sklar $1.2 million to $0.6 million.

2008
In March 2007, Paul announced his candidacy for U.S. president. According to Texas law, Paul could run for president without having to relinquish his Congressional seat. In the 2008 primary, he was opposed by Chris Peden, who informally announced his challenge on May 22, 2007. Peden, a certified public accountant, was elected to the Friendswood city council in 2005 with 67%, and was chosen as mayor pro tem.

The Victoria Advocate and Galveston County Daily News both endorsed Peden. Paul had a larger national source of funding, while Peden raised more money from the district, the majority of which came from within his own family or loans to himself. Paul won 70% to 30%.

On November 4, 2008, Paul was reelected. The election was uncontested because the Democrats did not run a candidate.

2010
On March 2, Ron Paul won the Republican Party nomination for re-election to the US House. Robert Pruett and Winston Cochran from the Democratic Party faced a runoff election in April to determine which one will get the nomination, a faced a runoff election in April to determine which one will get the nominations neither received a majority. Pruett won the run off election with just 52% of the vote, and lost to Paul in the general election.

2012
On July 11, 2011, Ron Paul announced that he would not seek re-election to the US House. Randy Weber and Felicia Harris from the Republican Party faced a runoff election in July to determine which one would get the nomination, a faced a runoff election in July to determine which one would get the nominations neither received a majority. Weber won the run off election with 63% of the vote, and went on to win the general election against Democrat Nick Lampson.

2014
Randy Weber ran for re-election in the 2014 general election, easily defeating his Democratic opponent Donald Brown.

2016

2018

2020

Historical district boundaries

See also
 List of United States congressional districts

References

14
Brazoria County, Texas